is a Buddhist temple in Kamakura, Kanagawa Prefecture, Japan. The statue stands at 25 meters/82 feet tall and weighs nearly 2,000 tons. It depicts the East Asian bodhisattva (a being that foregoes their nirvana in order to stay on Earth and help people) known as Guanyin or Kannon. Specifically, the Byakue (White-robed) Kannon, one of 33 forms of the Buddhist deity, said to prevent natural disasters, cure the sick, and assist women in childbirth. Ōfuna Kannon Temple (大船観音寺) is a Buddhist temple of the Sōtō school of Zen located in Ōfuna, northern Kamakura. Visitors heading to Kamakura will notice the most prominent feature of the Kannon-ji once their train approaches Ōfuna Station: the 25-metre tall snow-white statue of the bodhisattva Avalokiteśvara, known in Japan as Kannon (観音), the Goddess of Mercy.

History
Construction of the Temple began in 1929 by the Sōtō school of Zen. The outline of the statue was complete by 1934 but work was suspended at the outbreak of the Pacific War. The Ofuna Kannon Society continued construction work in 1954 and the Temple was finally completed in 1960. The statue construction is that of sections of poured concrete and was performed entirely by hand. No concrete pump trucks were used. The surface of the statue is oft painted white. The statue itself contains a small museum and shrine and both are open for viewing.

The Kannon incorporates stones from ground zero of Hiroshima and Nagasaki to commemorate those who died in the explosions of the atomic bombs. A fire originating from the atomic fires of Hiroshima burns in a mushroom-formed statue.

This is from the documentation provided at the statue site:

Accessibility
Ōfuna Kannon is close to the Ōfuna Station and costs 300 yen to enter.

See also
 For an explanation of terms concerning Japanese Buddhism, Japanese Buddhist art, and Japanese Buddhist temple architecture, see the Glossary of Japanese Buddhism.
 List of tallest statues

References

External links 

Buddhist temples in Kamakura, Kanagawa
Concrete Buddha statues
Concrete sculptures in Japan
Colossal Buddha statues in Japan